John Shearon   (1871–1932) was a Major League Baseball outfielder. He played for the Cleveland Spiders of the National League in 1891 and 1896. He continued playing in the minor leagues until 1903.

External links

Major League Baseball outfielders
19th-century baseball players
Cleveland Spiders players
Baseball players from Pennsylvania
1871 births
1932 deaths
Elmira Hottentots players
Albany Senators players
Rochester Flour Cities players
Erie Blackbirds players
Buffalo Bisons (minor league) players
Syracuse Stars (minor league baseball) players
Rochester Brownies players
Montreal Royals players
Chicago White Stockings (minor league) players